Javier Soler may refer to:
Javier Soler (tennis) (born 1955), Spanish tennis player
Javier Soler (footballer) (born 1997), Spanish footballer